The Estate is a BBC Northern Ireland documentary series similar to The Scheme, this time following the lives of several families in the Ballysally housing estate in Coleraine. The series was broadcast every Monday at 10:35pm from 23 January 2012 to 12 March 2012 on BBC One Northern Ireland and was broadcast to the rest of the UK every Tuesday at 11:35pm, 27 March - 15 May 2012 on BBC One and BBC One HD (2nd episode broadcast on a Monday, 3rd, 4th & 5th episodes at 11:40pm & 6th episode at 11:50pm).

Episodes 
The episodes were transmitted at the following times:

The episode shown on BBC One on 17 April 2012 was the final ever programme to be broadcast on the old analogue television system across London.

References

External links 

2010s British documentary television series
2012 British television series debuts
2012 British television series endings
2012 in Northern Ireland
BBC Northern Ireland television shows
BBC television documentaries
Coleraine
Housing estates in Northern Ireland
2010s television series from Northern Ireland